Westborough is a village in the South Kesteven district of Lincolnshire, England. The village is part of the civil parish of Westborough and Dry Doddington . 

Nearby to the north is Dry Doddington. The Viking Way and River Witham pass through the village.

The name 'Westborough' means 'west fortification'.

The village Grade I listed Anglican church is dedicated to All Saints.

References

External links

 Parish Council (shared with Dry Doddington)
 Village information

Villages in Lincolnshire
South Kesteven District